The 1923 Howard Bison football team was an American football team that represented Howard University during the 1923 college football season. In their first year under head coach Louis L. Watson, the Bison compiled a 7–0–1 record, outscored opponents by a total of 96 to 19, and were recognized as the black college national champion.

The championship game between Howard and Lincoln attracted 25,000 spectators, "the largest crowd in the history of colored football" to that time.

Schedule

Notes

References

Howard
Howard Bison football seasons
College football undefeated seasons
Black college football national champions
Howard Bison football